Zatrephes toulgoetana is a moth of the family Erebidae. It was described by Michel Laguerre in 2005. It is found in French Guiana.

References

Phaegopterina
Moths described in 2005
Moths of South America